Sylvia Nora Townsend Warner (6 December 1893 – 1 May 1978) was an English novelist, poet and musicologist, known for works such as Lolly Willowes, The Corner That Held Them, and Kingdoms of Elfin.

Life
Sylvia Townsend Warner was born at Harrow on the Hill, Middlesex, the only child of George Townsend Warner and his wife Eleanor "Nora" Mary (née Hudleston). Her father was a house-master at Harrow School and was, for many years, associated with the prestigious Harrow History Prize which was renamed the Townsend Warner History Prize following his death in 1916. As a child, Townsend Warner was home-schooled by her father after being kicked out of kindergarten for mimicking the teachers. She was musically inclined, and, before World War I, planned to study in Vienna under Schoenberg. She enjoyed a seemingly idyllic childhood in rural Devonshire, but was strongly affected by her father's death. She moved to London and worked in a munitions factory at the outbreak of World War I.

In 1923, she met T. F. Powys, whose writing influenced her own and whose work she in turn encouraged. The two became friends, and her debut novel, Lolly Willowes, was published shortly after in 1926. From her first work, it was clear that Warner's focus was on subverting societal norms; she would later heavily use the themes of rejecting the Church, a need for female empowerment, and independence in her works. It was at Powys' home that Warner first met Valentine Ackland, a young poet; the two women fell in love, moving in together in 1930 and eventually settling at Frome Vauchurch, Dorset, in 1937. Her relationship with Ackland inspired many of Warner's works, and the couple collaborated on a collection of poems, Whether a Dove or a Seagull, published in 1933. Warner and Ackland's relationship was tumultuous in part due to Ackland's infidelity, which included an affair with fellow writer Elizabeth Wade White. Alarmed by the growing threat of fascism, they were active in the Communist Party, and Marxist ideals found their way into Warner's works. Warner participated in the II International Congress of Writers for the Defence of Culture, held in Valencia between 4 and 17 July 1937, while serving in the Red Cross during the Spanish Civil War. After the war, Warner and Ackland permanently returned to England, living together until Ackland's death in 1969. In 1950 and 1951 they rented Great Eye Folly at Salthouse, where Warner wrote her final novel, The Flint Anchor (published 1954).

After Warner's death in 1978, her ashes were buried with Ackland's at St Nicholas, Chaldon Herring, Dorset.

Work
Early in her career Warner researched 15th and 16th century music. From 1917 she was in regular employment as one of the editors of Tudor Church Music, ten volumes published by Oxford University Press in the 1920s with the support of the Carnegie UK Trust. The lead editor was initially Sir Richard Terry, who as the Master of Music at Westminster Cathedral, had been a pioneer in the revival of Tudor vocal repertoire. Warner obtained the work as the protegee of her lover and music teacher Sir Percy Buck, who was on the editorial committee.

Warner was involved in travelling to study source material and in transcribing the music into modern musical notation for publication. Warner wrote a section on musical notation for the Oxford History of Music (it appeared in the introductory volume of 1929).

Her first published book was the 1925 poetry collection The Espalier, which was praised by A E Housman and Arthur Quiller-Couch. She was encouraged to write fiction by David Garnett. Warner's novels included Lolly Willowes (1926), Mr Fortune's Maggot (1927), Summer Will Show (1936), and The Corner That Held Them (1948). Recurring themes are evident in a number of her works. These include a rejection of Christianity (in Mr Fortune's Maggot, and in Lolly Willowes, where the protagonist becomes a witch); the position of women in patriarchal societies (Lolly Willowes, Summer Will Show, The Corner that Held Them); ambiguous sexuality, or bisexuality (Lolly Willowes, Mr Fortune's Maggot, Summer Will Show); and lyrical descriptions of landscape. Mr Fortune's Maggot, about a missionary in the Pacific Islands, has been described as a "satirical, anti-imperialist novel". In Summer Will Show, the heroine, Sophia Willoughby, travels to Paris during the 1848 Revolution and falls in love with a woman. The Corner That Held Them (1948) focuses on the lives of a community of nuns in a medieval convent.

Warner's short stories include the collections A Moral Ending and Other Stories, The Salutation, More Joy in Heaven, The Cat's Cradle Book, A Garland of Straw, The Museum of Cheats. Winter in the Air, A Spirit Rises, A Stranger with a Bag, The Innocent and the Guilty, and One Thing Leading to Another. Her final work was a collection of interconnected short stories set in the supernatural Kingdoms of Elfin. Many of these stories were published in The New Yorker. In addition to fiction, Warner wrote anti-fascist articles for such leftist publications as Time and Tide and Left Review.

After the death of the novelist T. H. White, Warner was given access to his papers.  She published a biography which The New York Times declared "a small masterpiece which may well be read long after the writings of its subject have been forgotten." White's long-time friend and literary agent, David Higham, however, questioned Warner's work, suggesting a bias in her approach due to her own homosexuality: he gave Warner the address of one of White's lovers "so that she could get in touch with someone so important in Tim's story.  But she never, the girl told me, took that step.  So she was able to present Tim in such a light that a reviewer could call him a raging homosexual.  Perhaps a heterosexual affair would have made her blush."

Warner produced several books of poetry, including Opus 7, a book-length pastoral poem about an elderly female flower-seller. The critical and personal hostility that greeted the jointly authored Whether a Dove or a Seagull in 1933 effectively put an end to the public poetic careers of both Warner and Ackland. It was only with the posthumous publication of Warner's Collected Poems in 1982 that the extent and significance of her poetry became evident, with poems ranging in date from 1914 through to 1978. Ackland's selected poems, Journey from Winter, were not published until 2008.

Although Warner never wrote an autobiography, Scenes of Childhood was compiled after her death on 1 May 1978 at age 84, based on short reminiscences published over the years in the New Yorker. She also translated Contre Sainte-Beuve by Marcel Proust from the original French into English. In the 1970s, she became known as a significant writer of feminist or lesbian sentiment, and her novels were among the earlier ones to be revived by Virago Press. Selected letters of Warner and Valentine Ackland have been published twice: Wendy Mulford edited a collection titled This Narrow Place in 1988, and ten years later Susanna Pinney published another selection, I’ll Stand by You.

Publications

Musicology
 Tudor Church Music. Edited by R. R. Terry, [E. H. Fellowes, S. T. Warner, A. Ramsbotham and P. C. Buck,] etc.

Novels
 Lolly Willowes (1926)
 Mr Fortune's Maggot (1927)
 The True Heart (1929)
 Summer Will Show (1936)
 After the Death of Don Juan (1938)
 The Corner That Held Them (1948)
 The Flint Anchor (1954) (vt The Barnards of Loseby, 1974)

Non-fiction
 T. H. White: A Biography (1967)

Short stories
 The Maze: A Story To Be Read Aloud (1928)
 Some World Far From Ours; and Stay, Corydon, Thou Swain (1929)
 Elinor Barley (1930)
 A Moral Ending and Other Stories (1931)
 The Salutation (1932)
 More Joy in Heaven and Other Stories (1935)
 24 Short Stories, with Graham Greene and James Laver (1939)
 The Cat's Cradle Book (1940)
 The Phoenix (1940)
 A Garland of Straw and Other Stories (1943)
 The Museum of Cheats (1947)
 Winter in the Air and Other Stories (1955)
 A Spirit Rises (1962)
 A Stranger with a Bag and Other Stories (vt. Swans on an Autumn River) (1966)
 The Innocent and the Guilty (1971)
 Kingdoms of Elfin (1977)

Posthumous
 Scenes of Childhood (1982)
 One Thing Leading to Another and Other Stories, edited by Susanna Pinney (1984)
 Selected Stories edited by Susanna Pinney and William Maxwell (1988)
 The Music at Long Verney (2001)

Poetry
 The Espalier (1925)
 Time Importuned (1928)
 Opus 7 (1931)
 Whether a Dove or Seagull (1933) (jointly with Valentine Ackland)
 Boxwood (1957) (collaboration with wood engraver Reynolds Stone)
 Collected Poems (1982)
 Selected Poems (Carcanet Press, 1985)
 New Collected Poems (Carcanet Press, 2008)
See also
 Ackland, Valentine, Journey from Winter: Selected Poems (Carcanet Press 2008)
 Steinman, Michael, The Element of Lavishness: Letters of Sylvia Townsend Warner and William Maxwell (Counterpoint 2001)

References

Further reading
 The Journal of the Sylvia Townsend Warner Society. UCL Press;. Open access journal available free online.
 Harman, Claire (1989) Sylvia Townsend Warner: A Biography. Chatto & Windus; 
 Pinney, Susanna (1998) I'll Stand by You: Selected Letters of Sylvia Townsend Warner and Valentine Ackland with narrative by Sylvia Townsend Warner. North Pomfret, Vt.: Pimlico/Trafalgar Square; 
 Mulford, Wendy (1988) This Narrow Place: Sylvia Townsend Warner and Valentine Ackland 1930-1951; 

External links

The Sylvia Townsend Warner Society
The Sylvia Townsend Warner Archive, Dorset County Museum, UK
Review of An Affair to Remember, The New York Times'', 7 March 1999
 
 

1893 births
1978 deaths
English short story writers
English historical novelists
Women historical novelists
English fantasy writers
English musicologists
Women musicologists
British bisexual writers
English women poets
English women novelists
Bisexual women
English anti-fascists
English communists
English translators
French–English translators
People from Harrow, London
Writers from Dorset
Place of death missing
English LGBT poets
English LGBT novelists
British women short story writers
Women science fiction and fantasy writers
Communist women writers
Communist Party of Great Britain members
English socialist feminists
20th-century English poets
20th-century English novelists
20th-century English women writers
20th-century British translators
20th-century British short story writers
20th-century British musicologists
20th-century women musicians
Writers of historical fiction set in the Middle Ages
Writers of historical fiction set in the modern age
Writers from London
20th-century LGBT people